KFLG (1000 AM, "K-Star 99.3 FM") is a radio station broadcasting an adult standards/MOR format. Licensed to Bullhead City, Arizona, United States, the station is owned by Cameron Broadcasting, Inc. and features programming from Dial Global. The station operates during the day only and signs off at local sunset to protect clear channel station KNWN in Seattle, Washington.

History
The station went on the air as KRHS on January 30, 1981. On January 28, 1991, the station changed its call sign to the current KFLG.

Translator
The station is also heard on 99.3 FM, through a translator in Laughlin, Nevada, and on 101.9 FM, through a translator in Kingman, Arizona.

References

External links

cameronbroadcasting.com

FLG
FLG
Adult standards radio stations in the United States
Radio stations established in 1981
FLG
1981 establishments in Arizona